Parayunnanolepis xitunensis is an extinct, primitive antiarch placoderm.  The fossil specimens, including a marvelously preserved, intact specimen, are known  from the Lochkovian Epoch-aged Xitun Formation of Early Devonian Yunnan.  The armor is very similar to that of Yunnanolepis, but is distinguished by being comparatively more flattened.

An intact and exquisitely preserved specimen demonstrates that the living animal had pelvic fins and a pelvic girdle, thus proving that antiarchs had, primitively at least, pelvic girdles, and or inherited them from a common ancestor of both placoderms and other gnathostomes.

References

Placoderm genera
Placoderms of Asia
Antiarchi
Prehistoric animals of China